Admixture may refer to:
 Genetic admixture, the result of interbreeding between two or more previously isolated populations within a species
 Racial admixture, admixture between humans, also referred to as miscegenation
 Hybrid
 Mixture, the chemical substance which results when two different materials are combined without occurrence of chemical reactions
 Admixture (concrete), the chemicals used to aid the properties of concrete or cement